Henri Guillod (15 October 1901 – 22 March 1979) was a Swiss racing cyclist. He was the Swiss National Road Race champion in 1923.

References

External links
 

1901 births
1979 deaths
Swiss male cyclists
People from Payerne
Sportspeople from the canton of Vaud
20th-century Swiss people